Karan Hegiste (born 23 March 2002) is an Indian sprinter. He was a gold medallist at the 3rd Asian Youth Games. He also represented Team India in the 100m race in that event. Hegiste has been a national medallist in several 100m and 200m events, including the 1st Khelo India School Games and 33rd National Junior Championship.

Career
In March 2019, Hegiste ran the first leg (100m) in a medley relay representing Team India.  Team India won a gold medal in that race and Hegiste played an important role in it. He trains in Mumbai under Sandarsh Shetty and hold many championship records including the Maharashtra State 100m record with the performance of 10.70 sec. Hegiste has claimed several national medals including the 1st Khelo India School Games and several national championships.
karan hegiste is also a future athlete of India as he may be represented in India in Olympic games in the future also.

References

Living people
2002 births
Indian male sprinters